Dir, dir, or DIR may refer to:

Acronyms
 De Imperatoribus Romanis, an online biographical encyclopedia of the Roman emperors from 27 BC to 1453 AD
 Detroit International Riverfront, an area of Detroit, Michigan in the United States
 Developmental, Individual differences, Relationship-based approach, a developmental intervention to autism 
 Digitally Imported Radio, an internet radio station
 Digital Instrumentation Recorder, a magnetic tape format by Sony
 Doing It Right, a methodology for scuba diving
 Double inversion recovery, an MRI sequence

In computing
 An abbreviation for directory (file systems)
 dir (command), a shell command
 directory (OpenVMS command), an operating system command
 , an HTML element

Places and areas
 Dir, Pakistan, a town in the Khyber Pakhtunkhwa province of Pakistan
 Dir (union council), an administrative unit in the Khyber Pakhtunkhwa province of Pakistan
 Dir (princely state), a former princely state in the North-West Frontier Province, incorporated into Pakistan in 1969
 Dir District in the North West Frontier Province, split into two districts in 1996

Government
Australian Government Department of Industrial Relations (1978–1982)
Australian Government Department of Industrial Relations (1987–1997)
California Department of Industrial Relations 
Texas Department of Information Resources

People
 Dir (clan), one of the five major Somali clans
 Askold and Dir, Viking rulers of Kiev

See also
Dirr (disambiguation)
Durr (disambiguation)
Duerr (disambiguation)